The SD public opinion reports, officially  ("Reports from the Reich"), were secret reports on public opinion in Nazi Germany prepared by the Security Service (SD) between 1939 and 1944 and distributed to high-ranking Nazi leaders. They are considered one of the most valuable sources on public opinion in Nazi Germany and have been described by historian Randall Bytwerk as "relatively objective as Nazi sources go".

References

Further reading

Reich Security Main Office
Public opinion
1939 establishments in Germany
1944 disestablishments in Germany